The Condamine River, part of the Balonne catchment that is part of the Murray-Darling Basin, drains the northern portion of the Darling Downs, an area of sub-coastal southern Queensland, Australia. The Condamine River is a tributary of the Darling River.

Course and features

The headwaters of the river rise on the slopes of Mount Superbus, part of the Main Range, before passing through Cambanoora Gorge. At Surat the Condamine turns to the south-west and becomes known as the Balonne River. The water basin contains more than 1,800 wetlands.

The Balonne River forks near Dirranbandi with a western branch being called the Culgoa River which, in turn, flows into the Darling River.  The eastern branch of the Balonne River in turn branches again - into the Bokhara River on the right and the Narran River on the left (eastern) side. These rivers join with the Barwon River west of Brewarrina which also flows into the Darling River. Towns the Balonne passes through include St George, Dirranbandi and Surat. In this area Bungil Creek joins the Balonne River.

Water storage

Water from the Condamine River is used for town water supply and for irrigation. Leslie Dam on Sandy Creek, a tributary of the Condamine, is the main water reservoir for Warwick. Talgai Weir is a small weir that can hold  near Clifton. Other water storage facilities on the Condamine River include the Yarramalong Weir, Lemon Tree Weir, Loudoun Weir, Tipton Weir and the Cecil Plains Weir. The Condamine River is reduced to a series of drying ponds during droughts in Australia.

Chinchilla Weir 
The Chinchilla Weir was built in 1973 and is located on the Condamine River, eight kilometres south of the town of Chinchilla. The weir has the dual purpose of providing supply of irrigation water along the alluvial flats of the Condamine River and of augmenting the water supply to the town of Chinchilla. Chinchilla Weir is a concrete faced earthfill structure and is known for the unique curved design of its wall. The weir is the only storage for the Chinchilla Weir Water Supply Scheme.

At the official opening of the Weir in 1974, approximately 5000 people were counted through the gates. Chinchilla Weir remains a freshwater playground for locals and visitors with waterskiing, canoeing, swimming and fishing being popular activities.

History
Parts of the water catchment were settled by the Bundjalung people. The Condamine River was named by Allan Cunningham in 1827 for Thomas de la Condamine, a former aide-de-camp to Governor Ralph Darling who became the colony's first Collector of Internal Revenue. Patrick Leslie was the first white settler in the area. He established Canning Downs in 1840, near Warwick.

Major Thomas Mitchell crossed the Balonne River on St George's Day, 23 April 1846. The next year 1847 Ludwig Leichhardt went to examine the course of the Condamine River. 

In 1985, it was proposed by the Water Research Foundation of Australia to transfer water from the Clarence River to the Condamine water basin. The Condamine River and its catchment area were involved in the 2010–11 Queensland floods.

Coal Seam Gas industry
The Coal Seam Gas industry (often referred to as Coal Bed Methane) started exploring for unconventional gas in the Chinchilla region, through which the Condamine River flows, around 2000 when Bob Bryan formed The Queensland Gas Company (QGC). From humble beginnings supplying gas into the domestic market, the industry grew quickly with the advent of the CSG/LNG industry and building of export facilities in Gladstone.

The gas is found in the coal seams and is adsorbed to the coal by water pressure. To extract gas from coal seams it is necessary to remove the water from the coal seams to allow the gas to flow. The de-watering of the Walloon Coal Measures has been raised as a concern by landholders, as stock water bores drilled into the coal seams can be affected by reduced water flows or gas. Under Queensland law, gas companies are required to "make good" if there is an impairment on a landholder's bore.

The Walloon Coal Measures are hydraulically connected to the aquifers of the Great Artesian Basin (within the Surat Basin) and in some locations immediately underlies the Condamine Alluvium.

Methane gas seeps
In 2012 methane gas was observed escaping from the river. The gas that is seeping is derived either from the underlying Walloon Coal Measures and/or the Springbok Sandstone. The Queensland Government undertook an investigation into the gas seeps and the technical study concluded that the bubbling was unlikely to be caused by coal seam gas (CSG) activities in the region, but that further studies were required.  In relation to the presence of methane in the river, the report concluded that “…there is no safety risk or evidence of environmental harm occurring in the immediate area from the Condamine River gas seeps."

In April 2016 the Condamine River seeps were brought to the forefront of media attention by New South Wales Greens MP Jeremy Buckingham, when he allegedly set alight the methane gas bubbling from the riverbed. He claimed that  "hydraulic fracturing" was the likely cause for the problem, but to date there is no direct link.

In 2017 CSIRO researchers with expertise in hydrogeology, geology, ecology and biogeochemistry assessed the Condamine River to determine what is currently known about the methane seeps in the River including natural and human causes, and the potential human and environmental health and safety impacts of methane escaping from underground. They concluded that there could be a number of reasons for the methane releases, but conceded that "depressurisation of the Walloon Coal Measures during gas production could generate horizontal migration of methane gas. However, this flux of methane is likely to be small because of the shallow dip of the coal beds and the distance to gas production fields." Other reasons for variation in bubbles includes changes in water flow, or flooding changing groundwater patterns. Hydraulic fracturing is not considered to be the cause as there has been no hydraulic fracturing in those fields.

Natural gas seeps are not altogether uncommon in Queensland, but there are no recorded instances of bubbles occurring in a river. The Queensland Gasfields Commission (a government agency) identified 17 soil gas surveys undertaken during the 1980s and 1990s, from locations around the state that record naturally occurring methane releases. The nearest one to the bubbling in the Condamine river was 16 km distant and not linked to the river. These measured low levels of mixed gas ranging from less than 10 parts per million (ppm) to 240ppm occurring in the subsoil at depths of up to one meter.

In 2017, the gas company that holds the tenure over this area of the river reported a 90% reduction in the level of the seep compared to the peak rate recorded in early-2016. This was done by intercepting and producing the gas before it reached the river, effectively taking it out of the system.

See also

References

External links

Rivers of Queensland
Tributaries of the Darling River
Floods in Queensland
Darling Downs